The 2011 Brisbane International was a joint ATP and WTA tennis tournament, played on outdoor hard courts. It was the 3rd edition of the tournament and took place at the Queensland Tennis Centre in Tennyson, Brisbane.

Players

Seeds

Qualifiers

Lucky losers
  Peter Luczak

Draw

First qualifier

Second qualifier

Third qualifier

Fourth qualifier

References

Qualifying